In statistics, Studentization, named after William Sealy Gosset, who wrote under the pseudonym Student, is the adjustment consisting of division of a first-degree statistic derived from a sample, by a sample-based estimate of a population standard deviation.  The term is also used for the standardisation of a higher-degree statistic by another statistic of the same degree: for example, an estimate of the third central moment would be standardised by dividing by the cube of the sample standard deviation.

A simple example is the process of dividing a sample mean by the sample standard deviation when data arise from a location-scale family. The consequence of "Studentization" is that the complication of treating the probability distribution of the mean, which depends on both the location and scale parameters, has been reduced to considering a distribution which depends only on the location parameter. However, the fact that a sample standard deviation is used, rather than the unknown population standard deviation, complicates the mathematics of finding the probability distribution of a Studentized statistic.

In computational statistics, the idea of using Studentized statistics is of some importance in the development of confidence intervals with improved properties in the context of resampling and, in particular, bootstrapping.

Examples
 Studentized range
 Studentized residual

See also
 Pivotal quantity

References

Statistical ratios